Ali Abdulkareem (Arabic: علي عبد الكريم) (born 12 May 1991) is a Qatari footballer. He currently plays for Al Bidda .

External links
 Ali Abdulkareem

Qatari footballers
1991 births
Living people
El Jaish SC players
Al Ahli SC (Doha) players
Al-Sailiya SC players
Al-Khor SC players
Muaither SC players
Al Bidda SC players
Qatar Stars League players
Qatari Second Division players
Place of birth missing (living people)
Association football forwards